Bugøynes Chapel is a chapel of the Church of Norway in Sør-Varanger Municipality in Troms og Finnmark county, Norway. It is located in the village of Bugøynes. It is an annex chapel for the Sør-Varanger parish which is part of the Varanger prosti (deanery) in the Diocese of Nord-Hålogaland. The white, wooden chapel was built in a long church style in 1989 by the architecture firm Lien & Risan Arkitektkontor. The church seats about 150 people. The church holds one regularly-scheduled worship service each month.

See also
List of churches in Nord-Hålogaland

References

Sør-Varanger
Churches in Finnmark
Long churches in Norway
Wooden churches in Norway
20th-century Church of Norway church buildings
Churches completed in 1989
1989 establishments in Norway